Tahjere McCall (born August 17, 1994) is an American professional basketball player for Fos Provence Basket of the LNB Pro A. He is also contracted with the Cairns Taipans of the National Basketball League (NBL). He played college basketball for the Niagara Purple Eagles and Tennessee State Tigers.

Early life
McCall was born in Philadelphia, Pennsylvania. He played basketball at Carver High School and was lightly recruited by college teams.

College career
McCall began his college basketball career with the Niagara Purple Eagles. He served as a starter during his freshman season under head coach Joe Mihalich in 2012–13. McCall was moved to a bench role for his sophomore season under new head coach Chris Casey. He chose to transfer from the team at the end of the season and joined the Tennessee State Tigers. McCall was selected as the Ohio Valley Conference (OVC) Defensive Player of the Year and earned All-OVC honors during his two seasons at Tennessee State.

Professional career

After going undrafted in 2017 NBA draft, McCall joined the Brooklyn Nets for the 2017 NBA Summer League and would join them for training camp. McCall played two seasons with the Nets NBA G League affiliate in Long Island. On February 26, 2019, he signed a 10-day contract with the Brooklyn Nets. McCall re-joined the Long Island Nets after the conclusion of his 10-day contract with the Brooklyn Nets.

On September 20, 2019, McCall signed an Exhibit 10 contract with the Atlanta Hawks. On October 18, 2019, the Hawks waived McCall. He was then added to the roster of the Hawks’ G League affiliate, the College Park Skyhawks. On December 27, 2019, McCall had 28 points, six rebounds, five assists, three steals and one block in a win against the Delaware Blue Coats. McCall had two triple-doubles. He averaged 12.7 points on 46 percent shooting, 4.7 assists, 1.9 steals, and 6.1 rebounds per game.

On January 11, 2021, McCall was selected by the Lakeland Magic as the 5th overall pick of the month's 2021 NBA G League draft and averaged 11.3 points, 7.1 rebounds and 3.1 assists through the season.

On March 29, 2021, McCall signed with Orléans Loiret Basket of the French Jeep Élite.

On August 6, 2021, McCall signed with the Cairns Taipans for the 2021–22 NBL season.

On April 23, 2022, McCall signed with the Otago Nuggets for the 2022 New Zealand NBL season. He left the team in mid June after being invited to an NBA summer training camp.

On May 31, 2022, McCall re-signed with the Taipans on a two-year deal. Following the 2022–23 NBL season, he joined Fos Provence Basket of the LNB Pro A.

Career statistics

NBA

Regular season

|-
| align="left"| 
| align="left"| Brooklyn
| 1 || 0 || 8.0 || .667 || .000 || .000 || 1.0 || 0.0 || 0.0 || 0.0 || 4.0
|-

College

|-
| style="text-align:left;"| 2012–13
| style="text-align:left;"| Niagara
| 32 || 23 || 19.8 || .369 || .000 || .436 || 3.3 || 2.4 || 1.2 || .0 || 4.0
|-
| style="text-align:left;"| 2013–14
| style="text-align:left;"| Niagara
| 27 || 14 || 22.7 || .413 || .083 || .734 || 3.0 || 2.0 || 1.3 || .3 || 7.5
|-
| style="text-align:left;"| 2015–16
| style="text-align:left;"| Tennessee State
| 31 || 28 || 30.1 || .455 || .278 || .756 || 5.1 || 3.0 || 2.3 || .4 || 14.6
|-
| style="text-align:left;"| 2016–17
| style="text-align:left;"| Tennessee State
| 27 || 27 || 32.1 || .435 || .243 || .637 || 5.0 || 5.1 || 2.8 || .5 || 14.3
|- class="sortbottom"
| style="text-align:center;" colspan="2"| Career
| 117 || 92 || 26.0 || .427 || .230 || .677 || 4.1 || 3.1 || 1.9 || .3 || 10.0

References

External links

NBA G League profile
Tennessee State Tigers bio
College statistics

1994 births
Living people
21st-century African-American sportspeople
African-American basketball players
American expatriate basketball people in Australia
American expatriate basketball people in France
American expatriate basketball people in New Zealand
American men's basketball players
Basketball players from Philadelphia
Brooklyn Nets players
Cairns Taipans players
College Park Skyhawks players
Lakeland Magic players
Long Island Nets players
Niagara Purple Eagles men's basketball players
Otago Nuggets players
Shooting guards
Tennessee State Tigers basketball players
Undrafted National Basketball Association players